A Journal of a Voyage to the South Seas, in His Majesty's ship, the Endeavour is a 1773 book based on the papers of Sydney Parkinson, who accompanied Joseph Banks as botanical illustrator on the first voyage of James Cook. Parkinson died at sea in 1771 on the return voyage, and the Journal was compiled by William Kenrick for Parkinson's brother Stanfield, who quarrelled with Banks about his brother's papers and belongings and attacked Banks and others in the book's preface. A legal injunction prevented the publication of the Journal until after the official account of Cook's voyage, edited by John Hawkesworth, had appeared. A second edition appeared in 1784 with explanatory remarks by John Fothergill.

The book is organised chronologically and mainly describes the voyage from England to Tahiti, the time spent there, and the encounters with New Zealand and Australia. It contains Parkinson's vocabularies of several Pacific languages and also many plant names given by Daniel Solander, but most of these have not been accepted as botanical names. The book is illustrated by engravings based on Sydney Parkinson's drawings. It has been praised for its authenticity but criticised by botanists for the low quality of the botanical content.

Background and publication 

Sydney Parkinson was born in Edinburgh  into a Quaker family and moved to London , where Parkinson taught drawing and was introduced to Joseph Banks and worked for him on natural history drawings. When Joseph Banks joined James Cook on his first voyage, he took Parkinson with him as part of his entourage, for a salary of £80 per year, . Before embarking on the journey, Parkinson had made a will leaving all his belongings to his brother and sister. While at sea, typically Banks and the botanist Daniel Solander worked together on the plant specimens collected on land excursions, with Parkinson drawing the plants, and Solander writing the descriptions and noting the plant name on the back side of Parkinson's drawings.

Parkinson kept a journal of the voyage from the start until he fell ill in January 1771. Unlike the ship's officers, Parkinson was not under orders to yield his journals to the Admiralty or to keep silent about details of the journey. According to his shipmates, his journal was substantial and "much admired", but no continuous version or "fair copy" has ever been found. On the return voyage, Parkinson fell ill with malaria and dysentery contracted at Batavia (now Jakarta, Indonesia), together with most of his shipmates. After his death on 26 January 1771, his employer Joseph Banks took care of his possessions. Banks announced the death of Parkinson to his brother Stanfield Parkinson, an upholsterer, after the ship had returned to England. Stanfield asserted that his brother's collections and journals and everything done in his spare time should be among the inheritance, and that only the botanical artwork was included in Parkinson's contract with Banks.

A lengthy dispute ensued, and when Banks was slow to hand over Sydney's property, Stanfield became increasingly suspicious of Banks, especially because he heard rumours that James Lee was to receive his brother's journal. This was based on a misunderstanding between Banks and Daniel Solander, who later clarified that the dying Parkinson had just asked that James Lee should be allowed to read his papers. The quarrel was finally mediated by John Fothergill, a Quaker physician and botanist who had known the Parkinson family in Edinburgh. Fothergill approached Banks and proposed and later witnessed an agreement between Banks and Parkinson's siblings. Banks paid £500 as outstanding salary and as compensation for the collections and papers, a settlement that did not satisfy Stanfield. Banks allowed him to borrow some of his brother's papers after Fothergill had made a strict promise that they would not be misused. Despite this promise, Stanfield arranged for a copy to be made and decided to publish the journal, attempting to pre-empt the official publication of Cook's and Banks's journals, which was edited by the writer John Hawkesworth. The writer William Kenrick was engaged as editor for Parkinson's papers, and added a preface attacking both Banks and Fothergill. A legal injunction obtained by Hawkesworth prevented the publication until after the latter's book, An Account of the Voyages, had appeared in 1773. These troubles played a part in the decline of Stanfield Parkinson's mental and physical health; he was committed to an insane asylum and died in 1776. The publication of the preface had been against Quaker rules, but Stanfield was declared insane before he could be excluded from the Westminster meeting, the Quaker congregation where Fothergill was also a member. Several of the engravings in Hawkesworth's book were based on Parkinson's drawings, but this was not acknowledged. While Fothergill had asked for such an acknowledgment, Banks himself had written to Hawkesworth advising against it.

The Journal appeared on 12 June 1773, two days after Hawkesworth's book. Fothergill, angry about attacks on him made in the preface, responded at some point between 1773 and 1777 with the publication of Explanatory Remarks on the Preface to Sydney Parkinson's Journal of a Voyage to the South Seas, denouncing Stanfield Parkinson's "treacherous behaviour". After the latter's death, Fothergill bought 400 remaining copies of the Journal from the family, and his Explanatory Remarks were added to the remaining copies. After Fothergill's 1780 death, a second edition was published in 1784, edited by John Coakley Lettsom, another Quaker botanist. This second edition contains some more additional material including maps showing all three of Cook's voyages and outlines of several recent voyages of exploration.

Content 

The book is structured roughly chronologically and broken up in three main parts: the first describes the voyage from England to Tahiti and contains chapters about plants, language, and tools that Parkinson had observed in Tahiti. The second part is concerned mostly with New Zealand; the third with Australia, the voyage to Batavia and the languages encountered on this part of the journey. A very brief fourth part recounts the return voyage after Parkinson's death. It is not certain whether the comments in the Journal are all from Sydney Parkinson or whether his brother or Kenrick inserted their own ideas. However, the work of Kenrick has been described as "quickly and competently done". The linguistic knowledge displayed in the book was unprecedented in a voyage narrative.

The journal contains some elements not found in other accounts of the voyage. For example, in the description of the near-fatal shipwreck when  struck Endeavour Reef in June 1770 and all pumps had to be continuously manned, Parkinson notes that everyone, including even the captain, took part.

The book contains 74 binomial names of Tahitian plant species together with their indigenous names. They are not arranged in any systematic order, and the names and descriptions were all given by Daniel Solander. Seven of the generic names and 46 binomials were new, but most lack a precise botanical description and are not accepted names in botanical nomenclature. The competing name Artocarpus was described in 1775/76 by Georg Forster and Johann Reinhold Forster, the naturalists on the second voyage of James Cook, in their book Characteres generum plantarum.

Besides a portrait of Parkinson, the book contains 27 engravings based on Parkinson's drawings, by various engravers. In some copies of the 1784 edition, they were hand coloured. Some may include alterations by the engraver; for example, Thomas Chambers's engraving Two of the Natives of New Holland, Advancing to Combat presents them with dart and sword, although Parkinson drew a woomera, a spear-throwing device. The holes in the shield are featured in Parkinson's descriptions, not in his known drawings. The posture and stance of the warriors in the engraving are similar to heroic figures of classical antiquity, unlike those in any of Parkinson's drawings of indigenous peoples, and are likely due to Chambers.

Reception and legacy 
The reviewer of the 1784 second edition for The Gentleman's Magazine explained the controversy around the first edition and praised the book, noting the authenticity of its observations. The illustrations and the word lists are mentioned as giving the Journal a "superiority over those of contemporary voyagers, who... have departed from the simplicity of Nature."

In his edition of Cook's journals of the first voyage, the Cook scholar John Beaglehole describes the book as a "primary authority for the voyage". Reviewing the 1984 reprint edition, the maritime historian Barry M. Gough praises Parkinson and states "he would have produced a better book had he lived", and gives the same assessment as Beaglehole on the authority of the book.

This suggestion was not followed by all authors. Another botanist, Harold St. John, rejected the names in Parkinson's book because they contained hyphens, but accepted the same names without hyphens as validly published in a 1774 German translation by an author known as "Z" of the chapter on plants. Other authors consider the question of hyphens to be just a typographical error. The identity of "Z" was unknown until 2006, when he was identified as Friedrich August Zorn von Plobsheim (1711–1789).

References

Sources

External links 

A Journal of A Voyage to the South Seas in the New Zealand Electronic Text Collection

1773 books
British travel books
English-language books
English non-fiction books
James Cook